Lyubov Isaakovna Axelrod (born Esther Axelrod; , penname Orthodox ; 1868 – 5 February 1946) was a Russian revolutionary, Marxist philosopher and an art theoretician.

Early life 
Axelrod was born in the family of a rabbi in Vilenkovichi, a village in the Vilna gubernia of the Russian Empire, now in Pastavy Raion, Belarus. She became involved with the narodnik organization at age 16. She emigrated to Switzerland in 1887, with the assistance of Leo Jogiches (lover of Rosa Luxemburg) when the Vitebsk organisation collapsed in the wake of an unsuccessful attempt to assassinate Alexander III of Russia organised by Aleksandr Ulyanov, older brother of Vladimir Lenin.

Political career

1892 to 1918 
In 1892 she became a Marxist and joined the Geneva-based Emancipation of Labor group, becoming a close associate of its leader Georgi Plekhanov. In 1900, she received her Ph.D. in philosophy from  Bern University. In 1902 she worked with Georgi Plekhanov and Lenin on the newspaper Iskra, as a contributor and an organiser. When the Russian Social Democratic Labor Party split into Bolsheviks and Mensheviks at its  Second Congress in 1903, she joined the Bolsheviks, but split with them soon afterwards, at the same time as  Plekhanov.

In 1906 Axelrod returned to Russia during an amnesty and became a leading Russian authority on Marxist philosophy, second only to Plekhanov, as well as working with the Mensheviks' illegal organisation. Her Philosophical Essays, published in 1906, were acknowledged by both the Bolsheviks and Mensheviks as the definitive rebuttal of the 'neo-Kantians' (Nikolai Berdyaev and Pyotr Struve, former Marxists who had broken with the revolutionaries. She was critical both of Alexander Bogdanov and of Vladimir Lenin during their debate over Empiriocriticism in 1908–1909, branding their ideas as anti-Marxist. In 1910, in Saint Petersburg, she joined the Central Trade Union Bureau, which was also illegal. After the outbreak of  war in 1914, like Plekhanov, she argued that  Germany was the aggressor and that Russia had a right to defend itself. She teamed up with two other prominent Marxist 'defencists', Pyotr Maslov and  Aleksandr Potresov to produce the fortnightly journal  ('Fact'). After the February Revolution of 1917 she joined the central committee of the Menshevik party, and following the October Revolution of November 1917 she was reunited with Plekhanov in the small anti-Bolshevik group Yedinstvo. She abstained from party politics after the May 1918 death of Plekhanov, and made it her life's work to defend his philosophy.

Later career 
In the 1920s she first worked at the Institute of Red Professors and later at the Soviet Institute of Philosophy. Her appointment to lecture in philosophy at Sverdlov University, in 1921, was originally blocked by the Orgburo, but when Lenin was consulted he said that it should be allowed, on condition that she was kept under observation in case she started promoting Menshevism. In the 1930s her version of Marxism was officially denounced as a Mechanistic revision of Marxism
and she faded into obscurity.

She died on 5 February 1946 in Moscow.

Published works 
Against Idealism (1922)

Marx as a Philosopher (1925)

Critique of the Foundations of Bourgeois Sociology and Historical Materialism (1925)

The Idealist Dialectic of Hegel and the Materialist Dialectic of Marx (1934)

References

External links 
  (in Alexander M. Kobrinsky's library): Site devoted to Lyubov Axelrod
 Frederick Choate's site on Lyubov Axelrod

1868 births
1946 deaths
People from Pastavy District
People from Vileysky Uyezd
Belarusian Jews
Jews from the Russian Empire
Mensheviks
Philosophers from the Russian Empire
Soviet philosophers
Jewish philosophers
Marxists from the Russian Empire
Russian women philosophers
20th-century Russian philosophers
19th-century philosophers from the Russian Empire
Emigrants from the Russian Empire to Switzerland
Academic staff of Moscow State University
University of Bern alumni
Russian expatriates in Switzerland